Kollam Taluk is one among the five taluks, or administrative areas, of Kollam district in Kerala State, India. This taluk contains the city area of Kollam and the municipal area of Paravur. Compared with other taluks, Kollam taluk is fairly developed.

See also
Kollam
Peringad

References

Taluks of Kerala
Geography of Kollam district